Chris Hemley (born 8 September 1977) is a former Australian rules footballer who played for St Kilda in the Australian Football League (AFL) in 1995. He was recruited from the Geelong Falcons in the TAC Cup with the 13th selection in the 1994 AFL Draft. This draft selection was part of the compensation received by St Kilda for trading Tony Lockett to Sydney. However, he never played another senior AFL game.

Hemley was one of the four St Kilda players featured at the start of the 1995 music video Greg! The Stop Sign!! by Australian band TISM.

Hemley would play for the Glenorchy Football Club in the Tasmanian Football League in 1999.

References

External links

Living people
1977 births
St Kilda Football Club players
Geelong Falcons players
Glenorchy Football Club players
Australian rules footballers from Victoria (Australia)